Snoa may refer to:
Curaçao synagogue or Mikvé Israel-Emanuel Synagogue
Snoa (dance), a traditional Swedish couple dance